SM UC-45 was a German Type UC II minelaying submarine or U-boat in the German Imperial Navy during World War I. The U-boat was ordered on 20 November 1915 and was launched on 20 October 1916. She was commissioned into the German Imperial Navy on 18 November 1916 as SM UC-45. In five patrols UC-45 was credited with sinking 12 ships, either by torpedo or by mines laid. UC-45 sank in a diving accident on 17 September 1917 in the North Sea. The German salvage vessel  raised the wreck and UC-45 re-entered service on 24 October 1918. She was surrendered on 24 November 1918 and broken up at Preston in 1919–20.

Design
A German Type UC II submarine, UC-45 had a displacement of  when at the surface and  while submerged. The submarine was powered by two six-cylinder four-stroke diesel engines each producing  (a total of ), two electric motors producing , and two propeller shafts.

UC-45 was fitted with six  mine tubes, eighteen UC 200 mines, three  torpedo tubes (one on the stern and two on the bow), seven torpedoes, and one  Uk L/30 deck gun. Her complement was twenty-six crew members.

Summary of raiding history

References

Notes

Citations

Bibliography

 
 

Ships built in Hamburg
German Type UC II submarines
U-boats commissioned in 1916
Maritime incidents in 1917
U-boats sunk in 1917
World War I minelayers of Germany
World War I shipwrecks in the North Sea
World War I submarines of Germany
1916 ships
Ships lost with all hands